The Kayts Island Fort (Kayits Dupath Balakotuwa) was built by the Portuguese in 1629 and was abandoned in 1651. In the late 1600s, Dutch controlled the fort when they took over the Kayts island. During the Dutch rule, it was not normal to undergo restoration like the former forts of Portugal.

The horseshoe shaped fort with four circular bastions was built to protect Jaffna Peninsula like other Portuguese forts in the peninsula. There was one of the primary commercial ports called “Urundai” beside the fort. Therefore, the fort was known as “Urundai Fort”. The Tamil word “Urundai” literally means sphere or round-shape.

See also 
 Forts of Sri Lanka

References

External links 
 Portuguese Forts in Sri Lanka

Dutch forts in Sri Lanka
Forts in Northern Province, Sri Lanka
Portuguese forts in Sri Lanka
1629 establishments in the Portuguese Empire
Archaeological protected monuments in Jaffna District
Kayts